Charles A. Bediako Jr. (born March 10, 2002) is a Canadian college basketball player for the Alabama Crimson Tide of the Southeastern Conference (SEC).

High school career
Bediako began his high school career at Ridley College, playing alongside his brother Jaden. As a junior, Bediako transferred to Andrews Osborne Academy. Bediako transferred to IMG Academy for his senior season. He averaged 13.2 points and 12.7 rebounds per game. Bediako was named to the Jordan Brand Classic roster.

Recruiting
Bediako was a consensus four-star recruit and one of the top centers in the 2021 class. On April 6, 2021, he committed to Alabama over offers from Duke, Michigan, Texas and Ohio State.

College career
As a freshman, Bediako averaged 6.7 points, 4.3 rebounds and 1.7 blocks per game. He was named to the SEC All-Freshman Team.

National team career
Bediako has competed internationally for the Canada men's national under-19 basketball team. He averaged 1.8 points and 2 rebounds per game in the 2018 FIBA Under-18 Americas Championship as Canada finished second in the tournament. In the 2018 FIBA Under-17 Basketball World Cup, Bediako averaged 3.3 points and 3.1 rebounds per game as Canada finished fourth in the tournament. In the 2021 FIBA Under-19 Basketball World Cup, Bediako averaged 4 points and 2.9 rebounds per game, helping Canada win the bronze medal.

References

External links
Alabama Crimson Tide bio

2002 births
Living people
Alabama Crimson Tide men's basketball players
Basketball people from Ontario
Canadian men's basketball players
Canadian people of Ghanaian descent
Centers (basketball)
IMG Academy alumni
Sportspeople from Brampton